Dyl may refer to:

People
 Dyl Harris (1926–1988), Welsh rugby league footballer
 Les Dyl (1952–2022), English rugby league footballer

Places
 DYL, the IATA code of Doylestown Airport, Pennsylvania

Other
 DYL Motorcycles
 Dylan (name)